Aceria erinea is a species of mite which causes galls on the leaves of walnut (Juglans regia). It was first described by Alfred Nalepa in 1891.

References

Eriophyidae
Animals described in 1891
Arachnids of Europe
Galls
Taxa named by Alfred Nalepa